Corpa is a location in Bolivia. In 2001 it had a population of 418.

References

Populated places in La Paz Department (Bolivia)